Ra.One is a 2011 Indian superhero film co-written and directed by Anubhav Sinha, and starring Arjun Rampal in the title role with Shahrukh Khan, Kareena Kapoor, Shahana Goswami and Armaan Verma in the lead roles. The film was co-produced by Red Chillies Entertainment and Eros International, and involved a large, multi-national crew for the production.

Commercially, the film set records for single-day net revenue and highest three-day opening weekend, though it suffered large drops at the box office in subsequent weeks. Ra.One became the third-highest-grossing Bollywood film of 2011. It is estimated that the film earned  worldwide if the dubbed versions are included.
  
Upon release, Ra.One met a mixed critical reception in India, though the overseas reception was more positive. Despite the mixed reception and reports of failing audience expectations, the film's visual effects and other technical aspects received unanimous praise from the audiences and a number of industry members, including prominent actors and directors. Mirroring this trend, Ra.One received a number of awards and nominations at high-profile ceremonies including the National Film Awards, Filmfare Awards and International Indian Film Academy Awards, the majority of them being for technical aspects like action, production design and sound design. The visual effects, executed by Red Chillies VFX under the supervision of Jeffrey Kleiser, won the award for Best Special Effects at nine award ceremonies.

Another heavily awarded feature of Ra.One was its business aspect, which won a number of awards at the ETC Bollywood Business Awards and the Zee Cine Awards for the marketing and box office records. The film also received numerous nominations for its soundtrack, with a special emphasis on the song "Chammak Challo" and its choreography. The film received further nominations at the Star Screen Awards and Stardust Awards, primarily for the acting and entertainment categories which were voted upon by popular choice. Despite this, it was reported that winning the National Film Award had given a major boost to the enthusiasm for a sequel to Ra.One.

Awards and nominations
Note – The lists are ordered by the date of announcement, not by the date of ceremony/telecast.

References

Portals

Ra One
Accolades